Leo Bunk (born 23 October 1962) is a German former professional footballer who played as a striker. He finished as top scorer of the 2. Bundesliga in the 1985–86 season, with 26 goals for Blau-Weiß Berlin.

References

External links

Living people
1962 births
German footballers
Association football forwards
TSV 1860 Munich players
VfB Stuttgart players
Alemannia Aachen players
Stuttgarter Kickers players
FC Augsburg players
Bundesliga players
2. Bundesliga players